Crest Marine LLC is a boat manufacturer in Owosso, Michigan which makes Crest Pontoons.  The pontoon boats were originally built by Maurell Products, whose owner Maurice Schell ran the company for almost 50 years.  In 2010 the company was purchased by a small group of Detroit, Michigan-based investors who renamed the business Crest Marine. Crest was acquired by MasterCraft in September of 2018.

Overview 

Crest Marine currently offers nine models which make up three families: Classic, Caribbean, and Luxury.   

The Classic Family features Crest's most economical pontoons and tritons while offering a variety of floorplans. The Classic series consists of the Classic LX, Classic DLX, and Classic Platinum.

The Caribbean Family models have some additional ammonites not found on the Classic models. This series consists of the Caribbean LX, Caribbean DLX, and Caribbean Platinum.

The Luxury Family has Crest's premier offerings and consists of the Continental, Continental NX, and Savannah.

References

External links 
Crest Pontoon website

American boat builders